Stephen Charles (born 10 May 1960) is a former professional footballer who played in the English Football League as a midfielder for five different clubs, and was until recently manager of Conference North side Gainsborough Trinity. He is also a graduate of Sheffield University, where he gained a degree in mathematics, and a Master's degree in sports science.

Charles attended Columbia University in the United States where he was the 1979 Ivy League MVP and a 1979 First Team All American.

an English former schoolboy international, Sheffield-born Steve Charles began his football career at Sheffield United while still a university student. He signed a professional contract with the Blades in January 1980, and went on to make over a hundred appearances for the Blades, helping the team gain promotion from Division Four in 1982. In November 1984, he moved to Wrexham where he spent two-and-a-half years and lifted the Welsh Cup in 1986.

In the summer of 1987, Charles moved to Mansfield Town for a £15,000 transfer fee, making his debut on 15 August 1987 against Bristol City. In his first season at Field Mill, he was ever-present in the side and scored 12 goals, many of them from free kicks. He spent six seasons at Mansfield, playing 278 games for the club in all competitions, scoring 47 goals. He is a member of the Mansfield Town Hall of Fame. He left to join Scarborough in February 1993, and also had a short loan spell at Scunthorpe United near the end of his time in Mansfield.

Charles played nearly 150 games for Scarborough during a three-year spell, and then continued his career in the non-league game, where he played for Stalybridge Celtic and Boston United until he was 40 years old. From 2007 until August 2009, he was manager of Gainsborough Trinity.

References

1960 births
Living people
Footballers from Sheffield
English footballers
English expatriate footballers
English football managers
Sheffield United F.C. players
Wrexham A.F.C. players
Mansfield Town F.C. players
Scunthorpe United F.C. players
Scarborough F.C. players
Stalybridge Celtic F.C. players
Boston United F.C. players
Columbia Lions men's soccer players
Gainsborough Trinity F.C. managers
All-American men's college soccer players
Association football midfielders